Badionkoto is a village in the Ziguinchor Department of the Ziguinchor Region of southwestern Senegal. In 2002 it had a population of 150 people.

References

Populated places in the Ziguinchor Department